Dr. Aalima Nowhera Shaik is an entrepreneur and politician. She is the executive chairperson and founder of Heera Group and founder and current president of the All India Mahila Empowerment Party. Shaik received an award by the UAE Minister for Business Leadership Icon In 2018.

Heera Group 
As per its website, Heera Group claimed that it was a company with diversified operations in various sectors including gold imports, gold trading, textiles, jewellery, mineral water, granite, tours and travels, real estate and e-commerce. Heera Mart, the group's shopping mall is located at Kukatpally, Hyderabad. As per the chargesheet filed by Telangana Police at the behest of investors, its subsequent investigation, and the declaration by the company itself, the company started operation in 2008 as a small import and export company called Hera Exim, renting 5 shop spaces in malls in Hyderabad, namely F1, F2, F3, F14 and F15. The company subsequently bought these spaces, and sold them to Indian Overseas Bank and Corporation Bank for Rs. 4 crore, the beginning capital investment for the group's subsequent activities. Subsequently, the shop shifted to Poatpally, and opened a large head office and call center in Banjara Hills, claiming to have international operations and floating investment schemes for small investors.
The Supreme court granted bail to  Nowhera and allowed here to do business. She was Accused of involvement of Rs 5,600 crore scandal.

Political life 
On 16 November 2017, Shaik founded the All India Mahila Empowerment Party. The party contested the 2018 Karnataka Legislative Assembly election and fielded candidates for all 224 constituencies, garnering 0.3% vote share. The party contested from all the 119 constituencies in the 2018 Telangana Legislative Assembly election and aims to contest in the 2019 Indian general election.
In 2016, a complaint was filed against Heera Group by Asaduddin Owaisi alleging that a number of investors from his constituency Hyderabad were cheated but was granted bail by the court on the condition to return investors' amount.

Awards and recognition
 Business Leadership Icon - 2018
 Extraordinaire – Powerful Women Achiever by NexBrands – Brand Vision Summit - 2017-2018
 Stardust Achievers Award - 2017
 Gulfood Award - Best New Comer Brand - 2016
 Woman of Integrity and Purpose Award - 2016
 Fastest Growing Indian Company Excellence Award - 2013

References 

Indian women business executives
Businesspeople from Andhra Pradesh
Living people
Businesswomen from Andhra Pradesh
1973 births